Aubrey Powell may refer to:

Aubrey Powell (designer) (born 1946), English graphic designer
Aubrey Powell (footballer) (1918–2009), Welsh football player